Remdovsky Zakaznik is a federal zakaznik, a nature protected area, in the northwest of Russia, located in Gdovsky and Pskovsky Districts of Pskov Oblast, north of the city of Pskov. It was established in 1985 to protect flora and fauna (in particular, rare species) of the lowlands adjacent to Lake Peipus.

The name of the zakaznik originates from the Remda River, a left tributary of the Zhelcha River, which flows in the zakaznik.

Geography 
Remdovsky Zakaznik is located on the eastern bank of Lake Peipus, in the area separating two its biggest parts, Lake Chudskoye (Lake Peipsi) in the north and Lake Pskovskoye (Lake Pihkva) in the south. The biggest river in the zakaznik is the Zhelcha, the lower course of which enters the zakaznik from the north. The area is flat and swampy. There are over twenty-five lakes in the zakaznik.

Flora
78% of the forest are pine forests, 2% is occupied by spruce, and 22% are birch, aspen, and alder.

Fauna
The big mammals within the zakaznik include moose, wild boar, roe deer, brown bear, fox, and raccoon dog.

References 

Geography of Pskov Oblast
Protected areas of Russia
Protected areas established in 1985
1985 establishments in the Soviet Union